Meiacanthus limbatus, the Manus fangblenny, is a species of combtooth blenny found in the western central Pacific Ocean, around Papua New Guinea.  This species grows to a length of  SL.

References

limbatus
Fish described in 1987